Rómmel is a surname. Notable people with the surname include:

 Juliusz Rómmel (1881–1967), Polish military general
 Karol Rómmel (1888–1967), Polish and Russian military officer, sportsman, and horse rider

See also
 Rommel (surname)

Polish-language surnames